Anastasiya Malyavina (born 30 December 1997) is a Ukrainian swimmer.

In 2014, she won the gold medal in the girls' 200 metre breaststroke at the 2014 Summer Youth Olympics held in Nanjing, China. She also won the bronze medal in the girls' 100 metre breaststroke event.

References

1997 births
Living people
Ukrainian female swimmers
Female breaststroke swimmers
Sportspeople from Kharkiv
Swimmers at the 2014 Summer Youth Olympics
Youth Olympic gold medalists for Ukraine
21st-century Ukrainian women